Dr William Francis Porter McLintock CB FRSE (2 February 1887 – 21 February 1960) was a 20th-century Scottish geologist and museum curator, serving both at the Royal Scottish Museum and the Natural History Museum, London. In authorship he is known as W. F. P. McLintock.

Life
He was born on 2 February 1887 the son of Peter Buchanan McLintock, a laundry owner at Deanbank in Stockbridge, Edinburgh. He was educated at George Heriot's School then studied science at the University of Edinburgh, graduating with a BSc in 1907. After University immediately started work as a geologist with HM Geological Survey under Ben Peach and John Horne. In 1911 he became Curator of the Geological Specimens at the Royal Scottish Museum. In 1921 he moved to London to the Natural History Museum. In 1930 he was involved in the relocation of the museum from Jermyn Street to South Kensington.

In 1916 he was elected a Fellow of the Royal Society of Edinburgh. His proposers were John Horne, Ben Peach, Sir John Smith Flett and Arthur Pillans Laurie.

In 1935 he became Acting Director of HM Geological Survey pending the appointment of Edward Battersby Bailey. In the Second World War  he was seconded to the Atomic Energy Division of the survey (seeking sources of Uranium). After the war he was appointed Director of HM Geological Survey.

He retired in 1950 and died in Edinburgh on 21 February 1960. He was invested Companion of the Order of the Bath (CB) in the 1951 New Year Honours.

Family
He married late in life, in 1939 (aged 52) to a widow, Mrs Maude Alice Marshall.

Publications
Guide Collection of Gemstones

References

1887 births
1960 deaths
Scientists from Edinburgh
People educated at George Heriot's School
Alumni of the University of Edinburgh
Fellows of the Royal Society of Edinburgh
Companions of the Order of the Bath
20th-century British geologists